HMS Spearfish was a second-batch S-class submarine built during the 1930s for the Royal Navy. Completed in 1936, the boat participated in the Second World War. The submarine was one of the 12 boats named in the song "Twelve Little S-Boats". So far she has been the only ship of the Royal Navy to be named Spearfish.

Design and description
The second batch of S-class submarines were designed as slightly improved and enlarged versions of the earlier boats of the class and were intended to operate in the North and Baltic Seas. They displaced  on the surface and  submerged. The S-class submarines had a crew of 40 officers and ratings.

For surface running, the boats were powered by two  diesel engines, each driving one propeller shaft. When submerged each propeller was driven by a  electric motor. They could reach  on the surface and  underwater.

The S-class boats were armed with six 21 inch (533 mm) torpedo tubes in the bow. They carried six reload torpedoes for a total of a dozen torpedoes. They were also armed with a 3-inch (76 mm) deck gun.

Construction and career
Ordered on 18 February 1935, Spearfish was laid down on 23 May 1935 in Cammell Laird's shipyard in Birkenhead and was launched on 21 April 1936. The boat was completed on 11 December 1936.

Her wartime career started inauspiciously, when on 24 September 1939, she was heavily damaged by German warships off Horns Reef. She managed to escape despite being unable to submerge. A rescue mission was undertaken by the British Humber force and Home Fleet, including the aircraft carrier , and the battleship , which performed escort duty whilst search and rescue attempts were made. The fleet was attacked by Junkers Ju 88 bombers of the Luftwaffe's Kampfgeschwader 30, and a bomb caused slight damage to the battlecruiser . Spearfish safely put in Rosyth on 26 September, and repairs were completed in early March 1940.

Another notable action occurred on 11 April 1940, whilst patrolling in the Kattegat, under the command of Lieutenant Commander John Hay Forbes, she torpedoed and damaged the German heavy cruiser Lützow, putting her out of action for over a year. At the time it was reported that she sank her sister ship, . Later that year, on 20 May, she sank two Danish fishing vessels S.130 and S.175 with gunfire in the North Sea.

Spearfish sailed from Rosyth on 31 July 1940, still under the command of "Jock" Forbes, to patrol off the Norwegian coast. There was only one survivor, Able Seaman William Pester, who was taken about the U-34 as a prisoner of war.

Citations

References
 
  
 
 
 
 
 

 

British S-class submarines (1931)
World War II shipwrecks in the Atlantic Ocean
1936 ships
World War II submarines of the United Kingdom
Ships built on the River Mersey
Ships sunk by German submarines in World War II
Lost submarines of the United Kingdom
Maritime incidents in August 1940
Submarines sunk by submarines